Arno van der Zwet (born 7 May 1986) is a Dutch former track and road cyclist. In 2010 he won the bronze medal in the team pursuit at the 2010 UEC European Track Championships in Pruszków, Poland.

Major results

2007
 2nd ZLM Tour
2010
 3rd  Team pursuit, UEC European Track Championships
2013
 3rd Overall Olympia's Tour
1st Stage 2
 9th Overall Tour du Loir-et-Cher
2015
 4th Skive–Løbet
 6th Arno Wallaard Memorial

References

External links

1986 births
Living people
Dutch male cyclists
People from Heerhugowaard
Dutch track cyclists
Cyclists from North Holland
20th-century Dutch people
21st-century Dutch people